Dalton Township may refer to the following places:

In Canada:
 Dalton Township, Ontario

In the United States:
 Dalton Township, Wayne County, Indiana
 Dalton Township, Michigan

Township name disambiguation pages